Wisdom of Forgiveness is Vusi Mahlasela's second album.

Track listing
 "Hope"
 "Ntate Mahlasela"
 "Ubuhle Bomhlaba"
 "Tontobane"
 "Fountain"
 "Basimanyana"
 "Yithi Masotsha"
 "Don't Tramp on Me"
 "Emigodini"
 "Nquondo Phumula"
 "Two Birds"
 "Treason"
 "Wisdom of Forgiveness"

Vusi Mahlasela albums
1994 albums